Agylloides is a genus of moths in the subfamily Arctiinae. The genus was described by Strand in 1912.

Species
 Agylloides asurella Strand, 1912
 Agylloides problematica Strand, 1912

References

Lithosiini
Moth genera